Sinta Wullur (born 16 November 1958) is an Indonesian-Dutch gamelan musician, pianist, singer, and classical composer.

Biography
Sinta Wullur was born in Bandung, Indonesia, and emigrated to the Netherlands in 1968. Wullur studied music at the Sweelinck Conservatory with Willem Brons and received a degree in piano. She also studied composition with Ton de Leeuw at the same conservatory, and continued her studies in 1988 at the Royal Conservatory of The Hague with the composers Theo Loevendie and Louis Andriessen. She studied electronic music with Gilius van Bergeijk and Jan Boerman, and gamelan and singing with several teachers in Bali and Java. She received her degree in composition in 1991.

Wullur founded several gamelan groups in the Netherlands, including Tirta and Irama, and since 1992 has worked with the gamelan ensemble Widosari as a Javanese singer. She uses chromatically tuned gamelan instruments in her compositions and with her own gamelan ensemble Multifoon. Wullur has issued recordings on CD, including most recently Gong and Strings.

Works
Wullur integrates Eastern and Western music in her compositions.  Selected works include:

Dreams and Fairy Tales
Khayal, performed on western instruments, structures and ideas from gamelan and Indian music
Ganatara, written for the Gamelan group Gending
Kaleidoscope, written for the Gamelan group Gending
10 Bulls for gamelan instruments, Western percussion and song.
Scenes from the Ramayana
Sita Lost
Mendung Indonesian
Ramayana through Flashbacks, opera, libretto by Paul Goodman
Sita's Liberation, gamelan opera for singers, narrator, dancers, wayang kulit, gamelan ensemble, string quartet, bass clarinet and full chorus

References

External links
Multifoon official site
Listen to Sita's Liberation at Malaysian Art Radio
Irama official site

1958 births
Living people
Women opera composers
20th-century classical composers
21st-century classical composers
Dutch women classical composers
Dutch classical composers
Dutch opera composers
Dutch women musicians
Indonesian classical composers
Indonesian opera composers
Indonesian traditional musicians
Indonesian women musicians
Conservatorium van Amsterdam alumni
Royal Conservatory of The Hague alumni
Indonesian emigrants to the Netherlands
Pupils of Louis Andriessen
People from Bandung